"The Wizard" is a song by the English heavy metal rock band Black Sabbath from their 1970 album Black Sabbath. "The Wizard" was selected as their debut single in France, backed by "Evil Woman" which was released as A-side in many other countries. 
It was also the B-side to the 1970 single "Paranoid", which reached number 4 on the UK Singles Chart and number 61 on the Billboard Hot 100.

Information
"The Wizard" is about a wizard who uses his magic to encourage people he encounters. In a 2005 interview with Metal Sludge, Black Sabbath bassist and lyricist Geezer Butler said the song's lyrics were influenced by the wizard Gandalf from The Lord of the Rings.

Personnel 
Ozzy Osbourne – vocals, harmonica 
Tony Iommi – guitar, slide guitar
Geezer Butler – bass
Bill Ward – drums

Covers and influence
The song was covered by Bullring Brummies, a short-lived project featuring Black Sabbath founding members Geezer Butler and Bill Ward, for the 1994 tribute album Nativity in Black.

References

Black Sabbath songs
Songs written by Tony Iommi
Songs written by Geezer Butler
Songs written by Bill Ward (musician)
Songs written by Ozzy Osbourne
1970 songs
Vertigo Records singles
Warner Records singles
Songs about drugs
Songs about wizards
British blues rock songs